{{DISPLAYTITLE:C15H14N4O}}
The molecular formula C15H14N4O (molar mass: 266.30 g/mol, exact mass: 266.1168 u) may refer to:

 Nevirapine (NVP)
 SB-200646

Molecular formulas